Uroš Tošković (Montenegrin Cyrillic: Урош Тошковић; 19 November 1932 – 3 March 2019) was a Montenegrin and Yugoslav painter and draftsman.

Early life
Tošković was born in a poor family in the village of Pelev Brijeg, in Bratonožići region of Montenegro, which was then a part of the Kingdom of Yugoslavia. His childhood was marked by poverty, experiences of an abusive father, and the atrocities of World War II. His three brothers died fighting for the Yugoslav Partisans.

After moving to Cetinje, Tošković enrolled in Art School, which was later transferred to Herceg Novi, where he graduated in 1952, in the class led by Petar Lubarda and Milo Milunović. Later he moved to Belgrade, where he graduated from the Academy of Fine Arts in 1956, in the class mentored by Marko Čelebonović. During the studies in Belgrade, Tošković partners with Dado Đurić, Olja Ivanjicki and others, forming the alternative artist group  in 1953.

Career
He lived and worked in Paris until 1976, leading an ascetic and bohemian lifestyle, occasionally living as a vagabond. He was a close friend of Dado, fellow Montenegrin painter who gained international recognition. Tošković claimed that he idolised Pablo Picasso and wanted to be mentored by the Spaniard, but was disenchanted upon meeting him and dropped the idea.

In 1976, he moved from Paris to Belgrade, and since 1996 he has resided in the Montenegrin coastal town of Bar. He gained recognition in his homeland, and in 1987 he received the 13th July Award, highest civil award issued by the Government of Montenegro.

Death 
Tošković died on 3 March 2019 at the age of 86.

References

1932 births
2019 deaths
Montenegrin painters
Montenegrin expatriates in France
People from Bar, Montenegro